The Acadia First Nation is composed of five Mi'kmaq First Nation reserves located in southwestern Nova Scotia. As of 2015, the Mi'kmaq population is 223 on-reserve, and 1,288 off-reserve. Acadia First Nation was founded in 1967 and covers the south shore area of Nova Scotia and Yarmouth County. The community runs multiple businesses including five gaming centres, three gas stations and two Rose Purdy centers.

Composition
Acadia First Nation is composed of five parts as shown:

See also
List of Indian Reserves in Nova Scotia
List of Indian Reserves in Canada

References

External links
 Acadia First Nation website

First Nations governments in Atlantic Canada
First Nations in Nova Scotia
Mi'kmaq governments
Communities in Lunenburg County, Nova Scotia
Communities in Queens County, Nova Scotia
Communities in Yarmouth County